Macomb Mountain is a mountain located in Essex County, New York. 
The mountain is named after Maj. Gen. Alexander Macomb (1782–1841), who won acclaim during the War of 1812 at the Battle of Plattsburgh, and served as Commanding General of the United States Army (1828–1841).

Macomb Mountain is part of the Dix Range, and is the southernmost of the High Peaks of the Adirondack Mountains.
Macomb is flanked to the northeast by South Dix.

Macomb Mountain stands within the watershed of the Schroon River, which drains into the Hudson River, and into New York Bay.
The east and northeast sides of Macomb Mtn. drain into West Mill Brook, thence into the Schroon River.
The northwest sides of Macomb Mtn. drain into Lillian Brook, thence into the East Inlet of Elk Lake, source of The Branch of the Schroon River.
The southwest side of Macomb drains into Slide Brook, thence into the East Inlet of Elk Lake.
The southeast slopes of Macomb drain into Niagara Brook, thence into The Branch of the Schroon River.

Macomb Mountain is within the Dix Mountain Wilderness Area of Adirondack State Park.

See also 
 List of mountains in New York
 Northeast 111 4,000-footers 
 Adirondack High Peaks
 Adirondack Forty-Sixers

References

External links 
  Peakbagger.com: Macomb Mountain
  Summitpost.org: Macomb Mountain
  Zeroing.org: Macomb Mountain Picture Gallery
 

Mountains of Essex County, New York
Adirondack High Peaks
Mountains of New York (state)